Bernard Baker may refer to:

 Bernard Granville Baker (1870–1957), British soldier and painter
 Bernard N. Baker (1854–1918), American shipping magnate
 Bernard S. Baker (1936–2004), American electrochemistry pioneer
 Bernard Baker (musician), musician and music educator at Conservatoire de musique du Québec à Montréal